John Stockwel may refer to:
John Frederick Stockwell (1915−1934), British murderer convicted of the Bow cinema murder in 1934
John Stockwell (CIA officer) (born 1937), American CIA officer and activist
John Stockwell (actor) (born 1961), American actor